Tamara Vega Arroyo (born March 9, 1993) is a Mexican modern pentathlete. She was born in Ciudad Juárez, Chihuahua. At the 2012 Summer Olympics, she competed in the women's competition, finishing in 36th (last) place but improved to 11th in 2016.

See also
 Modern pentathlon at the 2012 Summer Olympics – Women's
 Modern pentathlon at the 2016 Summer Olympics – Women's

References

External links
 

1993 births
Living people
Mexican female modern pentathletes
Olympic modern pentathletes of Mexico
Sportspeople from Ciudad Juárez
Modern pentathletes at the 2012 Summer Olympics
Modern pentathletes at the 2016 Summer Olympics
Modern pentathletes at the 2010 Summer Youth Olympics
Pan American Games medalists in modern pentathlon
Pan American Games silver medalists for Mexico
Modern pentathletes at the 2015 Pan American Games
Medalists at the 2015 Pan American Games
20th-century Mexican women
21st-century Mexican women